Valeri Grigoryevich Kikta (October 22, 1941 in Volodymyrivka, Donetsk Oblast, Ukrainian SSR) is a Russian classical composer, a professor of the Moscow Conservatory.

He was educated at the Moscow Choral College, then at the Moscow Conservatoire under Semyon Bogatyrev and Tikhon Khrennikov. On the recommendation of Shostakovich he moved on to post-graduate study.

Kikta's compositions include ballets, symphonic, organ and choral works. These include Beyond the Verge of Darkness for tenor and orchestra, and Frescos of the St. Sofia Cathedral of Kyiv for harp and orchestra.

He was recorded extensively by the USSR state recording company, Melodiya in the 1970s and 1980s.

References

External links
List of works compiled by Onno van Rijen

1941 births
Living people
People from Donetsk Oblast
Moscow Conservatory alumni
Male classical composers
20th-century classical composers
21st-century classical composers
20th-century male musicians
21st-century male musicians